Antonio Dawson, portrayed by Jon Seda, is a fictional character in the Chicago franchise and is a main character in Chicago P.D. and Chicago Justice. He was introduced as a recurring character on Chicago Fire before the spin-off Chicago P.D. was created. He is the former second-in-command of the Intelligence Unit of the Chicago Police Department (CPD) and regularly appears on Chicago Fire. He is also the older brother of Gabriela "Gabby" Dawson, formerly a paramedic-turned-firefighter at Firehouse 51.

The character is first introduced in Chicago Fire as one of several recurring characters from the CPD who cross paths with the firefighters. In October 2016, Seda confirmed that the character would move to the third spin-off Chicago Justice, debuting in March 2017, after resigning from his position in the CPD to take up a job with the State's Attorney's Office. After Chicago Justice is canceled, the character is written to have returned to the CPD due to his frustration with the bureaucratic red tape he often encounters.

Antonio Dawson has two kids. However, subsequent events in Season 1 and Dawson's dedication to his job take a toll on their marriage, resulting in her leaving with their two children. They eventually divorce under acrimonious terms and she prevents the children from seeing their father for some time. Eva took it particularly hard and even resorted to running away to see her father. The custody issue was never fully explained on the show; the children live with their mother and Dawson keeps in touch with them by phone.

Dawson was raised Catholic and once quipped to Olinsky about being "in a confessional every other day" as a boy. A boxing enthusiast (like actor Jon Seda), he had a difficult adolescence, and boxing was his outlet, as shown by the fact that he runs his own gym and moonlights as a trainer when off duty. He is the older brother of Chicago Fire character Gabriela "Gabby" Dawson. The siblings come from a large extended family and share a close relationship.

The character is frequently seen on Chicago Fire and was first introduced in the episode "Professional Courtesy" after Gabby and her colleagues from Firehouse 51 rescue a boy and his father in a car accident caused by a drunk Justin Voight, Hank's son. He is generally well-liked by the firefighters at 51.

Before transferring to Intelligence, Dawson worked on the Vice Squad. He was partnered with Detective Julie "Jules" Willhite, with whom he shared a close friendship until she was killed by drug lord Andres "Pulpo" Diaz in "Stepping Stone".

It has been mentioned by Gabriela Dawson that Dawson is in the crisis response team in the Bahamas in "Best Friend Magic".

In Chicago Fire
Antonio is a cop who takes pride in his job. He has been involved in numerous sting and undercover operations, some of which include drug busts, high-profile arrests, and more personal cases. Dawson has a close relationship with his sister, Gabriela Dawson, a paramedic for CFD. When Antonio is shot in a drive-by shooting and severely wounded, she makes a deal with Voight, who was incarcerated at the time, for information about who shot Antonio. When Voight harasses Lieutenant Matthew Casey and his then-fiancée Dr. Hallie Thomas, Dawson sets up a sting to arrest Voight. The arrest goes successfully and Voight is incarcerated. A few months later, Internal Affairs (I.A.) has Voight released and promoted to Sergeant of Intelligence at the CPD. In season 5, Antonio begins a relationship with CFD paramedic Sylvie Brett. At the end of "An Agent of the Machine", Antonio breaks up with Sylvie after she confronted him about the confrontation between her and his former wife Laura when she showed up at the firehouse to pick up her son. In "Down is Better", his father was stabbed. In "A Man's Legacy", he goes to the hospital to see his father. While in the hospital, he sees Sylvie with his sister and he talks with her, indicating that they may be close to reconciling. In "Foul is Fair", it was revealed that Sylvie has broken up with Antonio but at the end of the episode "Hiding Not Seeking", after a long investigation, Antonio and Sylvie are seen making out in his car.

In Chicago P.D. 

When Pulpo, a Colombian drug lord is arrested, Diego is kidnapped by a man named Mateo. Mateo demands that Pulpo be released or Diego will be killed. Antonio's devotion to his son is unwavering. Mateo attempts to take Diego to Indianapolis by bus, but Intelligence is able to stop him.

During his rookie years, Antonio had a partner, Sean Patterson. Sean had mistakenly filed double overtime pay, a minor infraction, however, Gradishar of Internal Affairs (IA) had Sean fired and took away his pension. The shame caused him to commit suicide a year later, leaving behind a wife and kids. Antonio has never forgiven Gradishar for using Sean as her way of climbing the corporate ladder.

He also worked with Trudy Platt, now the desk sergeant at the 21st District, during his patrol years and saved her life when she was shot by pulling her out of the line of fire.  During the shooter's subsequent interrogation, Dawson broke his jaw.

He was critically wounded when Pulpo's wife helped Pulpo escape, while three other officers were killed in the aftermath. Unlike Voight, he has limits on how far he will go to catch a criminal, as shown by the fact that he asked Jay Halstead to stop Voight from killing anyone while on the hunt for Pulpo as he did not want it on his conscience.

In "Chicken, Dynamite, Chainsaw", in the locker room at the end of the shift, Sean Roman tells him about his security business. Antonio takes the job and is tempted to have an affair with the client's seductive wife.

In "An Honest Woman", he was assigned to protect Asher Roslyn. In "Assignment of the Year", he didn't know Roslyn was a felon until Roslyn was found dead and he was implicated in the murder investigation. He confronted Roman about it and it was revealed that Roman himself didn't know about Roslyn's criminal history. Since Roman was involved with the unit on this case, he had to cooperate with the unit in apprehending Roslyn's killer (Roslyn's own wife, who had seduced her errand boy, Terry, into committing the murder which allowed her to escape prosecution. During the course of these episodes, it was shown that Roslyn's wife, Layla, was flirting with and trying to seduce Dawson but he turned down her advances.

In "A Little Devil Complex", he shoots and kills Trenton Lamont after he traps Gabriela Dawson in an elevator with gasoline which was poured on her and holding the lighter, when she receives a false text from Sylvie Brett telling Dawson to meet her.

In "300,000 Likes" Antonio is offered a job as lead investigator at the State's Attorney's Office, which he accepts in the next episode, "A Shot Heard Around the World".

At the end of "Reform", he gets the offer to return to Intelligence after his stint in the State's Attorney's Office.

In "Promise", with Dawson back in Intelligence, he takes on a case that involves the brutal murder of a young Latina woman who is suspected to be a drug mule for a drug cartel after he and his daughter Eva came up on a crime scene and his daughter overheard an officer at the scene throw out a racist comment with regards to the victim in which he takes it personally. He was also partnered with Kim Burgess. During the investigation, the victim was ID'd as Gloria Morales. While searching the victims' apartment, Burgess and Atwater find her young son hiding in the closet. The unit soon discovered that she was an illegal immigrant working in a meat packing plant. Burgess and Dawson decide to go interview the workers in the plant. Burgess finds the victim's sister, who at first refuses to cooperate, fearing for her safety, until Antonio promises her protection. When the manager's son was arrested, Antonio goes to the plant only to find out that the manager (in order to protect his son) had placed a tip to ICE that undocumented immigrants were working there, and rounded up everyone including the victim's sister. Voight orders Antonio let the suspect go due to lack of evidence. The kid recognizes that the van was there the night his mother disappeared and that the description matches another employee, Frank Lopez. But by the time Antonio and Burgess go there to question him, he was gone along with the van. After his conversation with the Medical Examiner, he finds out that the victim that he found wasn't the first victim and he goes to the store, only to know that the owner's niece also works at the plant and has disappeared and later found murdered. Voight tells Antonio which number in the lineup Frank will be (so that he can potentially tell Oscar). But Antonio can't bring himself to break the rules, and simply tells Oscar just to tell the truth. After the kid identifies the wrong person, the lineup was a bust. Voight angrily tells him to pick a case that he knows there is a quick output. Antonio goes to the same store in the investigation and finds out that Voight was there. He quickly goes to Frank's house only to find him murdered. Antonio goes to Voight to confront him in his office, while he secretly wanted it to happen, Voight admits to having him killed. He goes home to his daughter.

In "Chasing Monsters", he had a one-night stand with a visiting detective from El Salvador, Detective Marcella Gomez, after the two had mutual understanding that they separately are divorced. Kim grew suspicious of her but Antonio doesn't believe her. Antonio asks Marcella about talking to a detective in the gang unit and she is honest about it. Kim, on the other hand, meets with Detective Keith O'Brien feeling she isn't getting the whole story. He tells a totally different story saying Marcella called him 2 months ago about El Lobo, not just the day before. When Antonio comes into the Squad room, Kim reveals everything they know about Marcella Gomez. Antonio is in total shock then believes her. At a house where Marcella was held up, Antonio asks Marcella to put the gun down. Antonio says it isn't worth it. Voight asks her to give him the gun but she says her life has been over since he killed her son. She shoots El Lobo in the head and raises her gun at Antonio, who takes the shot and kills her. Kim checks on Antonio at the station, he apologizes, saying he was distracted and she is a good partner who was just looking out for him. Voight says she was on a mission and there was nothing he could have said that could have stopped her. The only thing that kept her going was that hate; he reminds Antonio that he did what he had to do. Antonio looks at her picture and throws it in the garbage saying he did what she wanted him to do.

In "Allegiance", he almost gets into a fight with Voight when he confronts him about why Olinsky was in prison.

In "Homecoming", his loyalty came into question when he sees an inmate that was responsible of killing Olinsky, severely beaten and left bleeding on the floor. Voight initially lies but Antonio didn't buy the story.  Voight told him that if he didn't approve he could get himself off the investigation. Voight orders Antonio to go a different way from him so that he can track down Carlos himself, and confronts the other man on the roof. The unarmed Carlos begs for his life, but Voight shoots him twice anyway—and says Carlos was reaching for a gun. Though Antonio does find a gun, two witnesses immediately exclaim that Voight shot the man "in cold blood." And he was left with trying to piece the story together into what had happened on the roof. While Antonio is skeptical, Ruzek didn't care since the dead man murdered Olinsky. Just before the two can fight, Antonio is called in to testify about the shooting. He runs into Voight in the hall after but the two don't speak.

In the season 6 premiere "New Normal", directly following the rattling death of Alvin Olinsky and the events after, Voight is put under investigation, leaving Antonio in charge of the unit. When Antonio answered truthfully about what he saw to the Police Board, he was unable to be of any help to Voight clearing his own name. This angered Ruzek, who defied the orders given to him by Antonio in return; it all comes to a head in the conclusion of a case, when both of them engage in a fight and have to be pried apart. Antonio was left taking the fall for the actions of Ruzek and the team, though no actual issues are mentioned; in the later episodes, which may have occurred following a time lapse, the two no longer show an ill will to one another, although Ruzek's rebellious nature is still a compromise.

In "Bad Boys", during the take-down of a criminal, Antonio injures his shoulder trying to break down a door.

In "Ride Along", despite Ruzek mentioning that Dawson's shoulder is looking better — followed with the claim by Dawson that he has been receiving acupuncture treatments — it is revealed that Antonio is actually taking painkiller medicine for his shoulder. Further, he was seen contacting his doctor to refill his painkillers every time he had run out which may seem that he may be addicted to them. It was confirmed in "Descent", when he ran out of a known drug house that was being raided by Intelligence, and was eventually caught by Burgess and lies about his involvement. He was caught by Voight buying pills from a drug dealer on the street. The situation became dire when his daughter was kidnapped by a drug addict, and the only way was to cut the drug dealer loose. After rescuing his daughter, Voight and Ruzek caught him. Dawson beats the kidnapper, and when he jokes about her age to aggravate him, he pushes him out the window to his death. Voight, having found out of Antonio's painkiller addiction, advises him to seek a rehab facility, while Ruzek covers for his mistake in "Brotherhood". When he came back from his rehab in "Trust", he had second thoughts about Ruzek taking the fall.  The case was reopened in "Confession" at the request of Superintendent Brian Kelton.

In "Reckoning", he learns from Platt that Internal Affairs had taken over the investigation, meaning they have evidence to take him down. Meeting with his old partner, he finds out the Internal Affairs' detective's daughter is working as a prostitute. Upon learning this, he decides to keep it a secret. At the end, he relapses and is seen taking pills, leaving his fate unknown.

In the season 7 premiere "Doubt", he later destroys whatever is in his apartment which was discovered by Ruzek, leaving his badge before vanishing without a trace from Intelligence; when Ruzek also finds his car with prescription pill bottles laying on the passenger's seat, it was revealed that he was using again. Voight, the only person aware of Antonio's circumstances, later takes him to an off-book rehabilitation center. In "Familia", it was revealed later that Antonio resigned and moved to Puerto Rico to be near his family.

Appearances and Crossovers 
The character is frequently seen on Chicago Fire as Gabby's colleagues sometimes ask him for help or advice and he is generally well-liked by the firefighters at Firehouse 51, and some after to get more information on investigations, and in Chicago PD, after his departure.
 Chicago Fire (season 1): 
"Professional Courtesy" (October 24, 2012)
 "Hanging On" (November 7, 2012)
 "Rear View Mirror" (November 14, 2012)
"A Little Taste" (February 6, 2013)
 "Nazdarovya!" (February 13, 2013)
 "Retaliation Hit" (May 1, 2013)
"Leaders Lead" (May 8, 2013)
 "Let Her Go" (May 15, 2013)
Chicago Fire (season 2):
 "A Problem House" (September 24, 2013)
 "Prove It" (October 1, 2013)
 "A Nuisance Call" (October 15, 2013)
 "Joyriding" (November 12, 2013)
 "You Will Hurt Him" (December 3, 2013)
 "Not Like This" (December 10, 2013)
 "Shoved In My Face" (January 7, 2014)
 "Virgin Skin" (February 25, 2014)
 "A Dark Day (1)" (April 29, 2014)
Chicago Fire (season 3):
 "Three Bells" (February 3, 2015)
 "We Called Her Jellybean" (April 28, 2015)
 "Category 5" (May 5, 2015)
 "Spartacus" (May 12, 2015)
Chicago Fire (season 4):
 "Let It Burn" (October 12, 2015)
 "Your Day Is Coming" (November 3, 2015)
 "When Tortoises Fly" (December 1, 2015)
 "Short and Fat" (December 8, 2015)
 "The Path of Destruction" (January 19, 2016)
 "The Sky Is Falling" (February 2, 2016)
 "All Hard Parts" (February 9, 2016)
"On the Warpath" (April 5, 2016)
 "I Will Be Walking" (April 19, 2016)
 "Where the Collapse Started" (May 10, 2016)
 Law & Order: Special Victims Unit  - "Nationwide Manhunt" (February 10, 2016)
 Chicago Fire (season 5):
"The Hose or the Animal" (October 11, 2016)  
 "Scorched Earth" (October 25, 2016)
 "That Day" (November 22, 2016)
 "Lift Each Other" (November 29, 2016)
 "One Hundred" (December 6, 2016)
 "An Agent of the Machine" (February 7, 2017)
 Chicago P.D. - "Seven Indictments" (February 15, 2017)  
 Chicago PD - "Emotional Proximity" (March 1, 2017)
Chicago Fire (season 6):
 "A Man's Legacy" (January 4, 2018)
 "The Whole Point of Being Roommates" (January 11, 2018)
 "Slamigan" (January 25, 2018)
 "Hiding Not Seeking" (March 8, 2018)
 "Looking for a Lifeline" (March 14, 2018)
 "The Chance to Forgive" (March 22, 2018)
 "Where I Want To Be" (April 19, 2018)
 "Make This Right" (January 23, 2019)

Reception 
Regarding his exit, Gina Zippilli of the Meet Us at Molly's podcast stated that "Antonio deserved better."

References 

Chicago P.D. (TV series) characters
Fictional characters from Chicago
Television characters introduced in 2012
Fictional Chicago Police Department detectives
Fictional personal trainers
Fictional boxers
Crossover characters in television
American male characters in television
Fictional Hispanic and Latino American people